I Give My Heart (US-Title: The Loves of Madame Dubarry) is a 1935 British historical film adapted from the stage operetta The DuBarry by Carl Millöcker and arranged by Theo Mackeben. Directed by Marcel Varnel, and produced by British International Pictures (BIP). It is based on the life of Madame Du Barry.

Plot
Jeanne is a milliner courted by aristocrats. She first has an affair with René, a young writer for Count du Barry. She then marries the Count in order to become Louis XV's mistress.

Cast
Gitta Alpar as Madame du Barry
Patrick Waddington as René
Owen Nares as Louis XV of France
Arthur Margetson as Count Du Barry
Margaret Bannerman as Marechale
Hugh Miller as Choiseul
Gibb McLaughlin as De Brissac
Iris Ashley as Margot
Hay Petrie as Cascal
Cicely Paget-Bowman
Philip Ridgeway

Critical reception
Allmovie described it as "standard historical-drama fare, allowing dozens of top European actors to play "dress-up" for 90 minutes"; while TV Guide noted "A rather stiff British production that is well done but not compelling," rating it 2/5 stars.

References

External links

1935 films
1930s romantic musical films
1930s historical musical films
1930s biographical drama films
1935 romantic drama films
British historical musical films
British romantic musical films
British biographical drama films
British romantic drama films
1930s English-language films
Films directed by Marcel Varnel
Films based on operettas
Operetta films
Biographical films about French royalty
Films set in the 18th century
Films set in France
Works about Louis XV
British black-and-white films
Films shot at British International Pictures Studios
Cultural depictions of Louis XV
Cultural depictions of Madame du Barry
British historical romance films
1930s musical drama films
1930s British films